"It Don't Matter" is a 2021 single by Alok, Sofi Tukker, and Inna 

It Don't Matter may also refer to:
"It Don't Matter", a song by Def Leppard from their 1980 album On Through the Night
"It Don't Matter", a song by Donavon Frankenreiter from his 2004 album Donavon Frankenreiter
"It Don't Matter", a song by Gang of Four from their 1983 album Hard
"It Don't Matter", a song by Jacob Collier from his 2019 album Djesse Vol. 2
"It Don't Matter", a song by Loverboy from their 1980 album Loverboy
"It Don't Matter", a song by Rehab from their 2000 album Southern Discomfort

See also
 It Doesn't Matter (disambiguation)
 Don't Matter, a song by Akon